Hans-Ullrich Schulz (24 May 1939 – 22 August 2012) was a German sprinter. He competed in the men's 4 × 400 metres relay at the 1964 Summer Olympics.

References

1939 births
2012 deaths
Athletes (track and field) at the 1964 Summer Olympics
German male sprinters
Olympic athletes of the United Team of Germany
Place of birth missing